Qianlingula is a genus of Chinese nursery web spiders that was first described by J. X. Zhang, M. S. Zhu & D. X. Song in 2004.  it contains only three species, found only in China: Q. bilamellata, Q. jiafu, and Q. turbinata.

See also
 List of Pisauridae species

References

Araneomorphae genera
Pisauridae
Spiders of China